Goughabad is a town located in the Punjab province of Pakistan. It is located in Faisalabad District.

References

Cities and towns in Faisalabad District